Henry Peter Coppola (August 4, 1912 – July 10, 1990) was a pitcher in Major League Baseball. He played for the Washington Senators in 1935 and 1936.

References

External links

1912 births
1990 deaths
Major League Baseball pitchers
Washington Senators (1901–1960) players
Hartford Senators players
Albany Senators players
Baseball players from Massachusetts